Keri Wong (born December 25, 1989) is an American former professional tennis player.

In her career, she won seven doubles titles on the ITF Women's Circuit. On April 21, 2014, she peaked at No. 156 in the WTA doubles rankings.

Wong made her WTA Tour debut at the Washington Open, partnering María Fernanda Álvarez Terán in doubles. The pair won their first round and quarterfinal matches, only to lose to eventual tournament champions Shuko Aoyama and Vera Dushevina in the semifinals.

ITF Circuit finals

Doubles (7–10)

References

External links
 
 

1989 births
Living people
Sportspeople from Jackson, Mississippi
American female tennis players
Tennis people from Mississippi
Clemson Tigers women's tennis players
American people of Chinese descent